The Sonnenberg is a ski resort in the Upper Harz surrounded by the Harz National Park. The settlement of the same name located there is part of the borough of Sankt Andreasberg.

Topography 

About a kilometre southeast of the Großer Sonnenberg is the Kleiner Sonnenberg which is only 40 cm lower. The L 519 state road runs over the 830 m high saddle between the two mountains and between the village of Sonnenberg and the main town of Sankt Andreasberg. Following the line of the crest further to the southeast for a further kilometre and beyond another saddle, 833 m high, one reaches the 892 m high Rehberg.

On the eastern slope of the Großer Sonnenberg is a triangulation station at a height of 838 m; this is the height shown on most topographical maps and is frequently misinterpreted as the actual height of the Großer Sonnenberg.

Winter sports 
There are three T-bars and a rope tow on the Sonnenberg for Alpine sports.

 Total piste length: 2,600 m
 Height difference: ca. 200 m
 Difficulty: 1,400 m easy; 1,200 m medium

For cross-country skiers the Sonnenberg Langlauf Network (Loipennetz Sonnenberg) offers a direct link to the trails around Sankt Andreasberg. In addition there is a connexion to the Ackerloipe and a link trail to Oderbrück, that runs past Oderteich. For tobogganists there is a separate toboggan piste. Medical support is provided by a first aid station operated by the Sankt Andreasberg Mountain Rescue organisation (Bergwacht Sankt Andreasberg) on the large car park, that is open during winter weekends. Due to its height the Sonnenberg has guaranteed snow until spring.

On the Sonnenberg there is also the state biathlon centre, in which national and international competitions are staged. In 2009, a snowmaking facility was built.

See also 
 List of mountains and hills in Lower Saxony
 List of mountains in the Harz

External links 
 Information about the Sonnenberg ski region
 Großer Sonnenberg ski lifts

Mountains of Lower Saxony
Mountains of the Harz
Mountains under 1000 metres
Ski areas and resorts in Germany
Sankt Andreasberg